Drezna is a town in Orekhovo-Zuyevsky District of Moscow Oblast, Russia, located on the river Drezna (Klyazma's tributary)  east of Moscow. Population:

History

It was founded by Ivan Zimin in 1897 as a mill town. It was named after the Drezna River. The mill utilised machinery supplied by Howard & Bullough for spinning and by Platt Brothers for weaving. Drezna was granted town status in 1940.

Administrative and municipal status
Within the framework of administrative divisions, it is incorporated within Orekhovo-Zuyevsky District as the Town of Drezna. As a municipal division, the Town of Drezna is incorporated within Orekhovo-Zuyevsky Municipal District as Drezna Urban Settlement.

References

Notes

Sources

External links

Drezna Business Directory 

Cities and towns in Moscow Oblast